Neocompsa fefeyei is a species of beetle in the family Cerambycidae. It was described by Joly in 1991.

References

Neocompsa
Beetles described in 1991